"Don't Happen Twice" is a song written by Curtis Lance and Thom McHugh and recorded by American country music artist Kenny Chesney.  It was released in January 2001 as the second single from Chesney's Greatest Hits compilation album .  The song reached number one on the US Billboard Hot Country Singles & Tracks (now Hot Country Songs) charts in June 2001.

Content
The song tells of a man meeting his first love, with her asking if he remembered her. He then tells her about all the times they spent together and how he could never forget them.

Music video
The music video was co-directed by Glen Rose and Kenny Chesney. It premiered on CMT on January 30, 2001, when CMT named it a "Hot Shot". Tim McGraw makes a cameo appearance.

Chart performance
"Don't Happen Twice" debuted at number 60 on the U.S. Billboard Hot Country Singles & Tracks for the chart week of January 20, 2001.

Year-end charts

Certifications

References

2001 singles
Kenny Chesney songs
Song recordings produced by Norro Wilson
Song recordings produced by Buddy Cannon
BNA Records singles
2000 songs
Songs written by Thom McHugh